This article is about the particular significance of the year 1907 to Wales and its people.

Incumbents

Archdruid of the National Eisteddfod of Wales – Dyfed

Lord Lieutenant of Anglesey – Sir Richard Henry Williams-Bulkeley, 12th Baronet  
Lord Lieutenant of Brecknockshire – Joseph Bailey, 2nd Baron Glanusk
Lord Lieutenant of Caernarvonshire – John Ernest Greaves
Lord Lieutenant of Cardiganshire – Herbert Davies-Evans
Lord Lieutenant of Carmarthenshire – Sir James Williams-Drummond, 4th Baronet
Lord Lieutenant of Denbighshire – William Cornwallis-West    
Lord Lieutenant of Flintshire – Hugh Robert Hughes 
Lord Lieutenant of Glamorgan – Robert Windsor-Clive, 1st Earl of Plymouth
Lord Lieutenant of Merionethshire – W. R. M. Wynne 
Lord Lieutenant of Monmouthshire – Godfrey Morgan, 1st Viscount Tredegar
Lord Lieutenant of Montgomeryshire – Sir Herbert Williams-Wynn, 7th Baronet 
Lord Lieutenant of Pembrokeshire – Frederick Campbell, 3rd Earl Cawdor
Lord Lieutenant of Radnorshire – Powlett Milbank

Bishop of Bangor – Watkin Williams 
Bishop of Llandaff – Joshua Pritchard Hughes
Bishop of St Asaph – A. G. Edwards (later Archbishop of Wales) 
Bishop of St Davids – John Owen

Events
3 January – Formal opening of the residence at St Deiniol's Library.
17 February – The cargo ship SS Orianda sinks off Barry after colliding with the SS Heliopolis, with the loss of 14 crew.
5 March – Six miners are killed in a shaft accident at Windsor Colliery, Abertridwr.
19 March – The National Library of Wales (Aberystwyth) and National Museum of Wales (Cardiff) receive their charters.
11 May – Swansea Corporation's newly constructed Cray Reservoir is filled with water for the first time.
11 July – Edward VII visits Bangor to lay the foundation stone of the new University College of North Wales buildings. Principal Henry Reichel is knighted.
13 July – Opening of the Queen Alexandra Dock in Cardiff, attended by the King and Queen.
25 July – Francis Edwards, MP for Radnorshire, is created a baronet.
1 November – First performance of John Hughes' hymn tune "Cwm Rhondda" in its final version, at Capel Rhondda Welsh Baptist Chapel, Hopkinstown, Pontypridd with the composer at the (new) organ.
10 November – Five miners are killed in an accident at Seven Sisters Colliery.
14 December – Seven miners are killed in an accident at Dinas Main Colliery, Gilfach Goch.
December – Edgeworth David joins Ernest Shackleton’s Nimrod Expedition to the South Pole.
date unknown
Owen Morgan Edwards becomes Chief Inspector of Schools for Wales.
The Board of Education establishes a special Welsh department.
C. H. Watkins designs and builds the first aircraft in Wales at Cardiff, and names it Robin Goch.
Opening of Dolgarrog hydroelectric power station.
Oakdale Colliery is sunk in the Sirhowy Valley.
The silver and lead mine at Llywernog reopens in order to prospect for zinc.

Arts and literature

Awards
National Eisteddfod of Wales – held in Swansea
Chair – Thomas Davies, "John Bunyan"
Crown – John Dyfnallt Owen

New books

English language
Eliot Crawshay-Williams – Across Persia
W. H. Davies – New Poems
Arthur Machen – The Hill of Dreams

Welsh language
Emyr Davies – Llwyn Hudol
John Jones (Myrddin Fardd) – Gwerin-Eiriau Sir Gaernarfon
John Morris-Jones – Caniadau
Joshua Thomas – Hanes y Bedyddwyr
T. Marchant Williams – Odlau Serch a Bywyd

Music
T. Hopkin Evans – Crowns of Golden Light and The Voyage
John Hughes – "Cwm Rhondda" (hymn tune, final version)
David Vaughan Thomas – Llyn y Fan

Architecture

 St David's Hotel, a hotel for golfers located at Harlech, in Gwynedd, is designed to plans by the Glasgow School architect George Henry Walton for a syndicate of entrepreneurs of which he was a member. (The proposals were subsequently revised in 1908, and the hotel was built in 1910. The hotel closed in 2008, and planning permission for demolition was approved in 2009).

Sport
Bowls – The Welsh Open Bowls Championship is launched.
Boxing
1 June – Jim Driscoll wins the British featherweight title.
8 August – Joe White wins the British welterweight title (disputed).
Rugby league
Ebbw Vale RLFC and Merthyr Tydfil RLFC are formed, the first Welsh rugby league teams.
Rugby union
Wales finish second in the 1907 Home Nations Championship
1 January – Cardiff beat the touring South Africa national team, 17 - 0.

Births
3 January – Ray Milland, actor (died 1986)
10 January – Nicholas Evans, artist (died 2004)
11 January – Reg Thomas, athlete (died 1946)
4 March - Emlyn John, footballer (died 1962)
6 April – Jacques Vaillant de Guélis, Special Operations Executive agent (died 1945)
30 April – Harry Bowcott, international rugby player and president of the Welsh Rugby Union (died 2004)
7 May – Trevil Morgan, cricketer (died 1976)
24 May – Gwyn Jones, writer (died 1999)
June – David Llewellyn, trade unionist (died after 1956)
8 June – Trevor Thomas, art historian and author (died 1993)
10 June – Ernie Curtis, footballer (died 1992)
19 June – Rodney David, cricketer (died 1969)
2 July – Dick Duckfield, cricketer (died 1959)
12 August – Rhys Lloyd, Baron Lloyd of Kilgerran, politician (died 1991)
25 August – Albert Fear, Wales international rugby player (died 2000)
25 September – Raymond Glendenning, radio sports commentator (died 1974)
30 September – Arthur Probert, politician (died 1975)
27 November – Glyn Prosser, Wales international rugby player (died 1972)
9 December – T. J. Morgan, academic (died 1986)
10 December – Harry Payne, Wales international rugby player (died 2000)
19 December – William Glynne-Jones, novelist and children's writer (died 1977)
21 December – Will Roberts, painter (died 2000)
22 December – Harold Jones, rugby player (died 1955)
23 December – Fred Warren, international footballer (died 1986)
26 December – Guy Morgan, rugby player and cricketer (died 1973)

Deaths
7 January – David Rowlands (Dewi Môn), minister, academic and writer, 70
13 January – Frances Elizabeth Wynne, artist, 71
10 March – George Douglas-Pennant, 2nd Baron Penrhyn, industrialist and politician, 70
24 March – John Pugh, minister (Forward Movement)
2 June – Rose Mary Crawshay, philanthropist, 79
5 July – John Romilly Allen, archaeologist, 60
14 August – David Treharne Evans, Lord Mayor of London
October – Hugh Davies (Pencerdd Maelor), composer
27 September – Alfred Davies, businessman and politician, 58
29 October – Megan Watts Hughes, singer, 65
11 November – Ralph Sweet-Escott, English-born Wales rugby international and Glamorgan cricketer, 38
12 November – Sir Lewis Morris, Anglo-Welsh poet, 74
27 November – Cyril Flower, 1st Baron Battersea, politician, 64
30 November – John Price, footballer, 52/3

References

 
1907